Sylvain Brébart (18 August 1886 – 18 February 1943) was a Belgian international footballer.

Career
Brébart played as a striker for Daring Club de Bruxelles and Anderlecht.

He also scored 8 goals in 12 appearances for the Belgian national side.

References

1886 births
1943 deaths
Belgian footballers
Belgium international footballers
R.S.C. Anderlecht players
Association football forwards